Metropolitan school may refer to:

Metropolitanskolen, Danish school in Copenhagen founded in 1209
The Metropolitan School, in Karachi, Pakistan
The Metropolitan School of Panama, in Panama City